Elections to Colchester Borough Council took place on 2 May 1996. They were held on the same day as other local elections across the United Kingdom.

At the election, the Liberal Democrats maintained their majority on the council. The Labour Party made a net gain of 4 seats to displace the Conservatives as the official opposition. This is the first time since the 1984 election that the Labour Party has held the official opposition.

Summary

Ward results

Berechurch

Castle

No Green candidate as previous (2.0%).

Dedham

East Donyland

Fordham

Harbour

No Green candidate as previous (1.4%).

Lexden

Marks Tey

Mile End

New Town

No Green candidate as previous (2.5%).

Prettygate

Shrub End

St. Andrew's

St. Anne's

St. John's

St. Mary's

Stanway

Tiptree

West Mersea

Wivenhoe

No Green candidate as previous (4.1%).

By-elections

Dedham

References

1996
1996 English local elections
1990s in Essex